Orestes (fl. 415 AD) was a Roman state official serving as governor of the diocese of Egypt (the Augustal prefect) in 415. During his term of office, he waged a violent feud against the bishop of Alexandria, Cyril, and their struggle precipitated the death of the philosopher and scientist Hypatia.

Biography 
In 415, during his office, he clashed with the young bishop of Alexandria, Cyril, who had been appointed shortly before Orestes to succeed to the Patriarchate of Alexandria after the death of Theophilus, Cyril's own uncle. Orestes steadfastly resisted Cyril's agenda of ecclesiastical encroachment into secular prerogatives.

On one occasion, Cyril sent the grammaticus Hierax to secretly discover the content of an edict that Orestes was to promulgate on the mimes shows, which attracted great crowds. When the Jews, with whom Cyril had clashed before, discovered the presence of Hierax, they rioted, complaining that Hierax's presence was aimed at provoking them. Then Orestes had Hierax tortured in public in a theatre. This order had two aims: the first was to quell the riot, the other to mark Orestes' authority on Cyril.

According to Christian sources, the Jews of Alexandria schemed against the Christians and killed many of them. Cyril reacted and expelled either all of the Jews, or else only the murderers, from Alexandria, actually exerting a power that belonged to the civil officer, Orestes. Orestes was powerless, but nonetheless rejected Cyril's gesture of offering him a Bible, which would mean that the religious authority of Cyril would require Orestes' acquiescence in the bishop's policy.

This refusal almost cost Orestes his life. Nitrian monks came from the desert and instigated a riot against Orestes among the population of Alexandria. These monks' violence had already been used, 15 years before, by Theophilus against the "Tall Brothers"; furthermore, it is said that Cyril had spent five years among them in ascetic training. The monks assaulted Orestes and accused him of being a pagan. Orestes rejected the accusations, showing that he had been baptised by the Archbishop of Constantinople. However, the monks were not satisfied, and one of them, Ammonius, threw a stone and hit Orestes in the head, and so much blood flowed out that he was covered in it. Orestes' guard, fearing to be stoned by the monks, fled leaving Orestes alone. The people of Alexandria, however, came to his help, captured Ammonius and put the monks to flight. Orestes was cured and put Ammonius under torture in a public place. The prefect then wrote to the emperor Theodosius II, telling him of the events. Cyril also wrote to the Emperor, telling his version of the events. The bishop also seized the body of Ammonius and put it in a church, conferring upon him the title of Thaumasius and putting his name in the list of the martyrs. However, the Christian population of Alexandria knew that Ammonius had been killed for his assault and not for his faith, and Cyril was obliged to remain silent about the events.

Prefect Orestes enjoyed the political backing of Hypatia, a philosopher who had considerable moral authority in the city of Alexandria, and who had extensive influence. Indeed, many students from wealthy and influential families came to Alexandria purposely to study privately with Hypatia, and many of these later attained high posts in government and the Church. Several Christians thought that Hypatia's influence had caused Orestes to reject all reconciliatory offerings by Cyril. Modern historians think that Orestes had cultivated his relationship with Hypatia to strengthen a bond with the pagan community of Alexandria, as he had done with the Jewish one, to handle better the difficult political life of the Egyptian capital. A Christian mob however, grabbed Hypatia out of her chariot and brutally murdered her, hacking her body apart and burning the pieces outside the city walls.

This political assassination eliminated an important and powerful supporter of the Imperial Prefect, and led Orestes to give up his struggle against Patriarch Cyril and leave Alexandria.

Legacy
Orestes is portrayed in Ki Longfellow's Flow Down Like Silver, Hypatia of Alexandria in a highly imaginative way. In the 2009 film Agora, by Alejandro Amenábar, Orestes is interpreted by Oscar Isaac.

See also 
 Cyril of Alexandria
 Hypatia

Notes

Sources 

 Susan Wessel, Cyril of Alexandria and the Nestorian controversy: the making of a saint and of a heretic, Oxford University Press, 2004, .

5th-century Roman governors of Egypt
Byzantine governors
Roman-era Alexandrians
Hypatia